Chyornaya rechka may refer to:
Chyornaya Rechka (Saint Petersburg), a small river in Saint Petersburg, Russia
Chyornaya rechka, alternative name for (any) Chyornaya River
Chyornaya rechka Municipal Okrug, a municipal okrug of Primorsky District in the federal city of St. Petersburg, Russia
Chyornaya Rechka (rural locality), several rural localities in Russia
Chyornaya Rechka (Saint Petersburg Metro), a station of the Saint Petersburg Metro, St. Petersburg, Russia